Willy McBean and His Magic Machine  is a 1965 stop motion animated time travel film produced by Arthur Rankin, Jr. and Jules Bass' Videocraft International (now Rankin/Bass Productions) in the United States and Dentsu Motion Pictures in Japan. It was presented by Marshall Naify, released by Magna Pictures Distribution Corporation on June 23, 1965.

The film tells the story of Willy McBean, a young schoolboy who teams up with an anthropomorphic monkey named Pablo to prevent the villainous professor Rasputin Von Rotten from changing the history of the world, using the newly created and duplicated "magic" time machine.

Written, produced and directed by Arthur Rankin, Jr., with Jules Bass and Larry Roemer as associate producers, the film uses a team of voice actors under the soundtrack recording supervision of Bernard Cowan in Canada, including Larry D. Mann as Von Rotten Billie Mae Richards as Willy And Paul Soles as Pablo the Monkey Tadahito Mochinaga supervises the "Animagic" stop motion process at MOM Productions in Japan, the same team behind the animation for The New Adventures of Pinocchio (1960–61) and Rudolph the Red-Nosed Reindeer (1964).

Plot
Willy McBean is sick of trying to learn history for school. Meanwhile, an evil scientist called Rasputin Von Rotten is building a magical time machine so he can go back in time and be the most famous person in history. A Spanish-English talking monkey named Pablo climbs through Willy's window. He explains that he escaped from Von Rotten and he tells Willy what he is planning to do. Pablo stole the plans to the time machine.

Willy builds his own machine to go back in time to stop Von Rotten. The machine isn't working properly. They end up with General George Armstrong Custer, and escape moments before Custer is killed.

They then arrive in the Wild West, where they meet Buffalo Bill Cody and his Indian pal, Sitting Bull. Von Rotten plans to become the fastest gun in the west. Von Rotten asks Bill for a showdown, but both guns are sabotaged before anyone can be shot.

Von Rotten moves onto his next target, Christopher Columbus. Once there, disguised as a Chinese trader, he convinces Columbus's crew that they should mutiny. Once more McBean and Pablo stop the evil professor by showing the crew that land is not far off.

After that, Von Rotten goes back to England in the days of King Arthur in the kingdom of Camelot, but Pablo and Willy get Arthur to pull Excalibur the magic sword that can talk. A talking green dragon then crashes into Camelot in an effort to eat everyone, but King Arthur and Excalibur are able to drive him away.

After a quick diversion to the Roman Colosseum, Willy and Pablo later go to Ancient Egypt to stop Von Rotten from building the Great Pyramid. Then they go back to prehistoric times to encourage cavemen to discover fire and invent the wheel before Von Rotten.

As they return to the present, Von Rotten shows the students history through his magic machine (in the form of a movie projector) during history class.

Voice cast
Larry D. Mann as Professor Rasputin Von Rotten
Billie Mae Richards as Willy McBean 
Paul Soles	as Pablo the Monkey, King Ferdinand
Alfie Scopp as Buffalo Bill Cody, The Dragon, General Custer	 
Paul Kligman as Christopher Columbus, Sitting Bull
Bunny Cowan as  King Tut, Ned the Caveman
Peggi Loder as Morgan le Fay
Claude Ray
Corrine Connely
James Doohan

Production credits
Written, Produced, Directed by Arthur Rankin, Jr.
Associate Producers: Jules Bass, Larry Roemer
Associate Director: Kizo Nagashima
Soundtrack Supervision: Bernard Cowan
Music Supervision by Forrell, Thomas and Polack, Associates, Inc.
Music by Edward Thomas
Songs by Jim Polack, Edward Thomas, Gene Forrell
Animation Supervision: Tadahito Mochinaga (credited as Tad Mochinaga)
Puppet Makers: Ichiro Komuro, Kyoko Kita, Reiko Yamagata, Sumiko Hosaka (all uncredited)
Animation: Tadahito Mochinaga, Hiroshi Tabata, Takeo Nakamura, Fumiko Magari, Tadanari Okamoto, Koichi Oikawa (all uncredited)
Choreography: Edward Brinkmann
Continuity Design: Anthony Peters (credited as Antony Peters)
Additional Dialogue: Len Korobkin
a Videocraft/Dentsu picture
a Marshall Naify/Magna Pictures Distribution Corporation presentation
© 1965 Videocraft International, Limited and Dentsu Motion Picture Corporation.

Songs

See also
List of American films of 1965

References

External links

1965 films
1965 animated films
1960s American animated films
1960s science fiction films
1965 Western (genre) films
American children's animated science fiction films
American Indian Wars films
American Western (genre) science fiction films
Animated films set in prehistory
Arthurian animated films
Canadian animated feature films
Cultural depictions of Christopher Columbus
Films about cavemen
Animated films about cavemen
Films about dragons
Films directed by Arthur Rankin Jr.
Films set in 1876
Films set in ancient Egypt
Films set in ancient Rome
Films set in England
Films with screenplays by Arthur Rankin Jr.
1960s stop-motion animated films
Animated films about time travel
Rankin/Bass Productions films
Films about Native Americans
1960s children's animated films
Japanese animated films
1960s English-language films
1960s Canadian films